Discretitheca is a genus of plants in the family Lamiaceae, first described in 1999. It contains only one known species, Discretitheca nepalensis, endemic to Nepal.

References

Lamiaceae
Endemic flora of Nepal
Monotypic Lamiaceae genera